Övergivenheten (English: The Abandonment) is the twelfth studio album by Swedish melodic death metal band Soilwork, released on 19 August 2022 via Nuclear Blast. It marks the first album with new bassist Rasmus Ehrnborn who joined as a touring member for the previous album Verkligheten cycle and became a permanent member in 2022, also making this album the first recorded as a six-piece since 2013's The Living Infinite. This was the last album to feature guitarist David Andersson who died on 14 September 2022.

Track listing

Personnel
Soilwork
 Björn "Speed" Strid – vocals
 Sylvain Coudret – guitars
 David Andersson – guitars, bass, piano
 Sven Karlsson – keyboards
 Bastian Thusgaard – drums
 Rasmus Ehrnborn – bass

Charts

References

2022 albums
Nuclear Blast albums
Soilwork albums